The Senate of the Dominican Republic is the upper house in the bicameral legislature of the Dominican Republic, and together with the Chamber of Deputies makes up the Congress.

The composition and powers of the Senate are established in Third Title, Chapter 1 in the First Section of the Dominican Constitution. Each province, and the Distrito Nacional, regardless of population, is represented by one senator who serves for a four-year term, with possibility of reelection. The Senate Chamber is located in the west wing of the Congress Palace, in Santo Domingo. The Chamber of Deputies convenes in the east wing of the same building.

The Senate has several advice and consent powers not granted to the Chamber of Deputies, including consenting to treaties, loans and contracts as a precondition to their ratification and consenting to or confirming appointments the members of Chamber of Accounts, Central Electoral Board and ambassadors. The Senate is widely considered both a more deliberative and more prestigious body than the Chamber of Deputies. Due to its smaller size and statewide constituencies, the Senate has historically had a more collegial and less partisan atmosphere.

Membership

Qualifications 

The constitution of the Dominican Republic states that to be a senator, one must be a Dominican in full exercise of civil and political rights, have attained twenty-five years old, and be a native of the territorial demarcation that choose or have resided there for at least five consecutive years. In consequence:
 The senators must reside in the territorial demarcation from which they are elected during their elected terms of office;
 Naturalized persons may be elected to the Senate ten years after having acquired Dominican nationality, provided they have resided in the territorial demarcation (jurisdiction) from which they seek election for a period of at least five years prior to their election.

Election and Terms 
The members of the Senate in Dominican Republic are elected by the D'Hondt method in relationship with the deputies. The terms for serving as senator are unlimited, one term corresponds to four years.

Oath 
The internal rules of procedure of the Senate  requires that senators take an oath or affirmation to support the Constitution. Congress has prescribed the following oath for all senators:

The oath to be provided is:

"I SWEAR TO GOD, THE HOMELAND AND MY HONOR, RESPECT CONSTITUTION AND LAWS AND COMPLY WITH DIGNITY AND THE FAITHFULLY OTHER DUTIES OF MY OFFICE",

what will be answered as follows:

"IF I DO SO, GOD AND THE PEOPLE WHAT OS REWARD IF I NOT, THAT I DEMAND IT. "

Majority and minority parties 
The "Majority party" is the political party that either has a majority of seats or can form a coalition or caucus with a majority of seats; if two or more parties are tied, the vice president's affiliation determines which party is the majority party. The next-largest party is known as the minority party.

Seating 
The majority party or the party with more senators traditionally sits to the presiding officer's right, and the minority party or the party with less senator traditionally sits to the presiding officer's left, regardless which party has a majority of seats.

Functions and Powers 
The exclusive powers of the Senate are:
 Know the allegations made by the Chamber of Deputies against and public officials. The plea leaves the person removed from office, and may not perform any public function, whether or not popularly elected for a term of ten years. The destitute person shall be subject, if any, to be charged and tried by the ordinary courts, in accordance with the law. This decision shall be taken by a vote of two-thirds of enrollment;
 To approve or disapprove the appointment of ambassadors and heads of permanent missions accredited abroad to submit to the President of the Republic;
 To elect the members of the Chamber of Accounts of the lists presented by the Chamber of Deputies, with the vote of two thirds of the senators present;
 To elect the members of the Central Electoral Board and their deputies, with the vote of two thirds of those present;
 Choose the Ombudsman, their deputies and their deputies from the triads to submit to the House of Representatives, by a vote of two-thirds of those present;
 To authorize, upon request of the President of the Republic, in the absence of agreement permitted, the presence of foreign troops in military exercises in the territory of the Republic, as well as determine the time and conditions of their stay;
 To approve or disapprove of sending troops abroad in peacekeeping missions authorized by international organizations, setting the conditions and duration of the mission.

Current composition (2020-2024)

Senators elected in the July 2020 elections. This list contains the changes that occurred after the election until 1 May 2021.

Composition (2016-2020)
Senators elected in the May 2016 elections.

Party strengths in the Senate
The following table shows the composition of the Senate at the start of the most recent legislative periods.

See also
Politics of the Dominican Republic
List of political parties in the Dominican Republic
List of presidents of the Senate of the Dominican Republic

References

External links
Senate of the Dominican Republic
Senate of the Dominican Republic (Spanish)

Government of the Dominican Republic
Dominican Republic
1844 establishments in the Dominican Republic
1908 establishments in the Dominican Republic